Garkan-e Olya (also Romanized as Garkān-e ‘Olyā; also known as Ḩasīnjān, Qara Khān, and Qareh Khān) is a village in Yusefvand Rural District, in the Central District of Selseleh County, Lorestan Province, Iran. At the 2006 census, its population was 304, in 73 families.

References

Towns and villages in Selseleh County